Illusion in a Minor Key is a 1952 West German drama film directed by  Rudolf Jugert and starring  Hildegard Knef, Sybille Schmitz and Hardy Krüger.

It was made at the Bavaria Studios in Munich. It was one of the last films produced by the veteran Erich Pommer who had returned to Germany from exile after the Second World War. The film's sets were designed by Ludwig Reiber. It is sometimes included on lists of film noirs.

Synopsis
The recently widowed owner of a hotel falls in love with the wayward bandleader who performs at the establishment. Her plans to marry him upset her children who believe he is simply after her money.

Cast

References

Bibliography 
 Hans-Michael Bock and Tim Bergfelder. The Concise Cinegraph: An Encyclopedia of German Cinema. Berghahn Books, 2009.
 Andrew Spicer. Historical Dictionary of Film Noir. Scarecrow Press, 2010.

External links 
 

1952 films
1952 drama films
German drama films
West German films
1950s German-language films
Films directed by Rudolf Jugert
Bavaria Film films
German black-and-white films
1950s German films